John Brodie Spence (15 May 1824 – 7 December 1902) was a prominent Scottish-born banker and politician in the early days of South Australia. He was a brother of the reformer Catherine Helen Spence.
	
Spence was born in Melrose, Scottish Borders to David Spence (1790–1846), solicitor and first Town Clerk of Adelaide, and Helen Brodie Spence (1791–1887). He arrived in South Australia on 31 October 1839 on the Palmyra with his mother. Other children of David and Helen on the passenger list were his sisters Catherine, Jessie, Helen and Mary and brother William. His father arrived earlier (13 October 1839) on the Dumfries.

The family was struggling to make ends meet, so after some seven months, he and his brother went farming, without much success, and he moved to Adelaide in 1845, joining either the Bank of Adelaide or the Bank of South Australia, where he remained for seven years. He was afterwards for five years official assignee and curator of intestate estates, then in 1856 accountant in the Railway Department, and from 1859 to 1864 Official Assignee and Curator of Intestate Estates. but left that office for the management of the English and Scottish Bank (soon to become English, Scottish and Australian Chartered Bank) which he held till 1878. Between around 1879 and 1881 he was involved with Arthur Harvey in land development at The Grange and East Adelaide.

He was elected a member of the legislative council in 1881, second on the poll with Henry Ayers, W. C. Buik, James Rankine, John Pickering, and R. A. Tarlton. He was Chief Secretary in the Downer Government from June to October 1885, when he retired to take the position of Commissioner of Public Works. In June 1886 he again took office as chief secretary, retiring the following month. On 5 February 1896, he was appointed one of the first five trustees of the State Bank, and was chairman of the board at the time of his death.

Family
His parents were David Spence (1790–1846) and Helen Spence (née Brodie) (1791–1887). Their children were:
Agnes Spence (9 February 1818 – c. 1835)
Jessie Spence (1821 – 21 November 1888) married Andrew Murray (c. 1814 – 7 October 1880) on 2 November 1841. He was businessman then journalist for the South Australian and later the Melbourne Argus and Economist.
William Richard Spence (13 December 1822 – 1903 New Zealand )
John Brodie Spence (1824 – 7 December 1902) married Jessie Cumming (1830 – 31 January 1910) on 22 April 1858. Their home was "Fenton", Glenelg. They had three daughters:
Lucy Spence (1 March 1859 – 10 June 1951) married James Percy Morice on 20 March 1886. She was awarded the MBE for her work with the free kindergarten movement. She was also one of the founders of the Mothers and Babies' Health Association in Adelaide.
Agnes Helen Spence (19 December 1863 – 27 August 1949)
Margaret Ethel Spence (26 August 1865 – ) married George A. Stephen on 18 August 1887
Catherine Helen Spence (31 October 1825 – 3 April 1910)
David Spence, jnr. (1827–1890) stayed in Scotland for his education, emigrated in 1846. Never married.
Mary Brodie Spence (c. 1830 – 22 November 1870) married William John Wren (c. 1829 – 6 February 1864) on 19 December 1855. Wren was with legal firm Bartley, Bakewell, & Stow, then solicitor in partnership with James Boucaut as Boucaut & Wren.

Further reading
Magarey, Susan Unbridling the Tongues of Women: A biography of Catherine Helen Spence  University of Adelaide Press 2nd edition 2010  (paperback). Available for free reading at Web.Archive.org

References

 

|-

|-

Members of the South Australian Legislative Council
Australian bankers
Australian real estate businesspeople
1824 births
1902 deaths
19th-century Australian politicians
People from Melrose, Scottish Borders
Scottish emigrants to colonial Australia
19th-century Australian businesspeople